This is a list of awards dedicated to honoring or recognizing African Americans.

Awards 
 Afro-Academic, Cultural, Technological and Scientific Olympics
 BCALA Literary Awards (Black Caucus of the American Library Association Literary Awards). Annual literary award from the American Library Association, Black Caucus, which honors "outstanding works of fiction and nonfiction for adult audiences by African American authors"
 The BET Honors, which celebrates the lives and achievements of African American luminaries.
 Candace Award, National Coalition of 100 Black Women
 Coretta Scott King Award (annual literary award from the American Library Association given to African American authors and illustrators)
 Golden Eagle Award, Afro-American in the Arts
 Black Movie Awards
 Essence Literary Awards (defunct)
 Glyph Comics Awards
 Langston Hughes Medal
 Miss Black America
 Miss Black USA
 NAACP Image Awards (given by the NAACP annually to people of color)
 NAACP Theatre Awards
 Percy L. Julian Award
 Shelia Award (alt. spelling "Sheila Award"), Harriet Tubman African American Museum
 Spingarn Medal
 William E. Harmon Foundation award for distinguished achievement among Negroes

 
African Americans
African American-related lists